Eslamshahr and Suburbs Bus Organization is a public transport agency running Transit buses in Eslamshahr County's localities and connects them to Tehran and its Metro System.

There are 3 special routes in the system, these routes only have stops in the neighbourhood they start their route from.

List of Routes

References

Transport in Iran
Eslamshahr County
Bus transport in Iran